The Swiss Chalet National was held from December 15 to 19, 2010 at the Wesbild Centre in Vernon, British Columbia. 18 men's teams were playing for 8 quarterfinal spots in a round-robin format. The purse for this event was CAD$100,000.

The event was the second men's Grand Slam event of the 2010-11 curling season.

Teams

Round robin

Standings

Results

Draw 1
Wednesday, December 15, 7:30 pm

Draw 2
Thursday, December 16, 10:00 am

Draw 3
Thursday, December 16, 1:30 pm

Draw 4
Thursday, December 16, 5:00 pm

Draw 5
Thursday, December 16, 8:30 pm

Draw 6
Friday, December 17, 10:00 am

Draw 7
Friday, December 17, 1:30 pm

Draw 8
Friday, December 17, 5:00 pm

Draw 9
Friday, December 17, 8:30 pm

Playoffs

Quarterfinals
Saturday, December 18, 12:00 pm

Semifinals
Saturday, December 18, 6:00 pm

Final
Sunday, December 19, 10:00 am

Notes

External links
The National Event Page

2010 in Canadian curling
The National (December)
Sport in Vernon, British Columbia
Curling in British Columbia
The National (curling)